The 1945 Cal Poly Mustangs football team represented California Polytechnic School—now known as California Polytechnic State University, San Luis Obispo—as an independent during the 1945 college football season. Led by Ronnie Henderson in his first and only season as head coach, Cal Poly compiled a record of 1–5–1. The team was outscored by its opponents 180 to 19 for the season and was shut out in four consecutive games. The Mustangs played home games at Mustang Stadium in San Luis Obispo, California.

Schedule

References

Cal Poly
Cal Poly Mustangs football seasons
Cal Poly Mustangs football